The Atlanta Opera is an opera company located in the Atlanta metropolitan area. Founded in 1979, it produces mainstage opera productions and arts education programs for Metropolitan Atlanta and the Southeast.

In 2007, The Atlanta Opera moved into its new performance home at the Cobb Energy Performing Arts Centre where it produces four mainstage productions each season.

History 

In the late 1970s, the Metropolitan Opera stopped touring to Atlanta, leaving a void in the region. Volunteers and civic leaders joined forces to continue opera in Atlanta. In 1979, the Atlanta Civic Opera was formed, a result of a merger between two competing entities, Atlanta Lyric Opera and Georgia Opera.

The first artistic director was noted composer Thomas Pasatieri. In 1985, the company was renamed to The Atlanta Opera. The company's first production was La Traviata on March 28, 1980, at the Fox Theatre. The following December, a festive gala was held in Symphony Hall with such noted young artists as Catherine Malfitano, Jerry Hadley and Samuel Ramey.

Atlanta Opera has a number of home venues: in 1990 it moved to the Atlanta Symphony Hall, in 1995 to the Fox Theatre, in 1998 to its own building, the Atlanta Opera Center at 728 West Peachtree St., in 2003 to the Boisfeuillet Jones Atlanta Civic Center, and finally in 2007, The Atlanta Opera moved into its new performance home at Cobb Energy Performing Arts Centre, just outside the city and county limits.

The company celebrated its 30-year anniversary during the 09/10 Season. The current Music Director and Conductor is Arthur Fagen, Professor of Music (Orchestral Conducting) at Indiana University.
In 2013 the company hired the internationally recognized stage director, Tomer Zvulun to be its General and Artistic director. Zvulun directed over 15 new productions in Atlanta, including Dead Man Walking, The Flying Dutchman, Soldier Songs, Silent Night, Maria de Buenos Aires, La Bohème, Madama Butterfly, Lucia di Lammermoor, Magic Flute, Eugene Onegin. The company's innovation initiatives  garnered national attention and resulted in a Harvard Business School case study, an International Opera Awards nomination and an ArtsATL luminary award. 
The company celebrates its 40th anniversary in the 19/20 season and is performing six productions per season.

Gallery

See also

Opera in Atlanta
Arts in Atlanta

References

External links

Atlanta Opera articles on Encore Atlanta, the official show program of Atlanta Opera

Musical groups from Atlanta
American opera companies
Musical groups established in 1979
Performing arts in Georgia (U.S. state)